Kidira is a town and commune in Tambacounda Region of eastern Senegal, lying near the Malian border. Its population in 2013 was about 10,000.

Transport 

It is an important transport hub and lies on the N1 and N2 roads, the Dakar – Bamako railway and the Falémé River.

See also 
 Railway stations in Senegal

References 

Populated places in Tambacounda Region
Mali–Senegal border crossings
Communes of Senegal